Semiplotus cirrhosus is a species of cyprinid in the genus Semiplotus. It inhabits Myanmar and has a maximum length of  among males. It is considered harmless to humans and is classified as "data deficient" on the IUCN Red List.

References

Cyprinid fish of Asia
Fish of Myanmar
IUCN Red List data deficient species